Martín Edwin García (born 2 March 1981 in Bogotá, Cundinamarca) is a Colombian football forward who last played for Tianjin Songjiang.

Club career
García played youth football with América de Cali, before making his professional debut in the Copa Mustang with Independiente Santa Fe in 1998. He played several seasons with Alianza in El Salvador, before returning to Colombia where he would play several seasons with Millonarios in the Copa Mustang. He played for Vasco da Gama and São Caetano in the Campeonato Brasileiro Série A. García also had a brief spell with Necaxa in the Primera División de México.

Notes

References

1981 births
Living people
Colombian footballers
Colombian expatriate footballers
Independiente Santa Fe footballers
Envigado F.C. players
Deportes Quindío footballers
Alianza F.C. footballers
Millonarios F.C. players
Associação Desportiva São Caetano players
CR Vasco da Gama players
Club Necaxa footballers
Shanghai Shenxin F.C. players
Shanghai Port F.C. players
Sport Boys footballers
Cienciano footballers
Cúcuta Deportivo footballers
Tianjin Tianhai F.C. players
China League One players
América de Cali footballers
C.D. Atlético Marte footballers
Categoría Primera A players
Liga MX players
Campeonato Brasileiro Série A players
Expatriate footballers in Brazil
Expatriate footballers in El Salvador
Expatriate footballers in Mexico
Expatriate footballers in China
Expatriate footballers in Peru
Colombian expatriate sportspeople in Brazil
Colombian expatriate sportspeople in El Salvador
Colombian expatriate sportspeople in Mexico
Colombian expatriate sportspeople in China
Colombian expatriate sportspeople in Peru
Association football forwards
Footballers from Bogotá